Sir Robert Gunter, 1st Baronet (2 November 1831 – 17 September 1905) was a British Army officer, property developer and Conservative Party politician who sat in the House of Commons from 1885 to 1905.

Gunter was the son of Robert Gunter of Earl's Court, London and his wife Fanny Thompson, daughter of E. Thompson of Durham. His grandfather James Gunter was a confectioner of Gunter's Tea Shop whose purchases led to the development of some 60 acres of land in West London. Gunter was educated at Rugby School and joined the 4th Dragoon Guards. He served in the Crimean War and became captain. After the death of their father in 1852 Gunter and his brother James developed the Redcliffe Estate area, giving their name not just to "Gunter Grove", but to many other streets in the area. He settled in Yorkshire at Wetherby Grange in Collingham, near Knaresborough. He was a J.P. for the West Riding of Yorkshire, and Lieutenant-Colonel commanding the 3rd Battalion Princess of Wales's Own (Yorkshire Regiment).

Gunter was elected was Member of Parliament (MP) for Knaresborough in the West Riding of Yorkshire at a by-election in 1884 following the death of the sitting MP Thomas Collins.  The Knaresborough constituency was abolished in the Redistribution of Seats Act 1885 . In the 1885 general election, Gunter was elected MP for the new Barkston Ash constituency. He represented the constituency until his death in 1905 at the age of 73.

He was granted the dignity of a baronet 18 April 1901, of Wetherby Grange, in the parish of Collingham, in the county of Yorkshire.

Gunter married Jane Marguerite Benyon, daughter of Thomas Benyon of Gledhow Hall, Yorkshire in 1862. A street in Chelsea called "Edith Grove" is named after their daughter, Edith, who died of scarlet fever aged eight.

Arms

References

External links 
 

1831 births
1905 deaths
Baronets in the Baronetage of the United Kingdom
Conservative Party (UK) MPs for English constituencies
UK MPs 1880–1885
UK MPs 1885–1886
UK MPs 1886–1892
UK MPs 1892–1895
UK MPs 1895–1900
UK MPs 1900–1906
Robert